Pousada de Rengos is one of 54 parish councils in Cangas del Narcea, a municipality within the province and autonomous community of Asturias, in northern Spain.

Villages
 Caldeviḷḷa de Rengos
 Pousada de Rengos
 Ventanueva
 Viḷḷar de Pousada

References

Parishes in Cangas del Narcea